Carlton Frederick, better known as Carl Frederick, or Frithrik, is a science fiction author, theoretical physicist, and American business man living in Ithaca, New York. He has written numerous short stories that have appeared in Analog Science Fiction and Fact, Andromeda Spaceways Inflight Magazine, Asimov's Science Fiction, Flash Fiction Online, Jim Baen's Universe, Space and Time, and other publications.  Frederick has been nominated for the Anlab, Analog's Reader's Choice Award, award six times.  He is a graduate of Odyssey Writing Workshop and a first-place winner of Writers of the Future. Frederick owns a website called Darkzoo where one can read his interactive novel "Darkzoo - Second Edition", read about his physics endeavors, his bio, The Omnivor Robot, and more.

Bibliography
Carl Frederick is a theoretical physicist. After a post-doc at NASA and a stint at Cornell University, he left theoretical astrophysics and quantum relativity theory in favor of hi-tech industry. He is Chief Scientist of a small company doing artificial intelligence software. He has two grown children. For recreation, he fences epee, learns languages, and plays the bagpipes. He lives in rural, Ithaca, New York. He is predominately a short story writer. His work appears mainly and often in Analog Science Fiction and Fact.

Science fiction works
In the early 2000s, Frederick decided to write science fiction. Since then, he has written a few novels and various short stories.

Awards 
 AnLab Award for Best Short Story
 First place winner in the Writers of the Future contest

Physics
Frederick is currently doing theoretical physics, in particular, Crypto-Stochastic Space-time theory.
Among other things, Frederick is a quantum as well as an astrophysicist. Before he came to Cornell, he worked as an astrophysicist at NASA's Goddard Institute. Frederick designed and built balloon-borne telescopes for making far-infrared astronomical observations. These were launched from sites in Arizona and Argentina, most of the launches were from Palestine, Texas.

Leaving academia
Frederick went to a graduate school with only two departments, Mathematics and Theoretical Physics. Just to name a few, here are some of the most noted faculty Frederick worked with, Yakir Aharonov [of the Aharonov Bohm Effect], P.G. Bergman [one of Einstein's six students], A.G.W. Cameron, P.A.M. Dirac, Freeman Dyson, David Finklestein, Arthur Komar, Joel Liebowitz, Aage Pederson [Niels Bohr's student], and Leonard Susskind [co-founder of String Theory].

“I looked upon them almost as Greek heroes: they were attempting to understand the universe at the very deepest level and because of that were likely doomed to fail. (I'm reminded of Steven Weinberg's statement: 'The effort to understand the universe is one of the very few things that lifts human life a little above the level of farce, and gives it some of the grace of tragedy.')”
 
Frederick chose to do an experimental thesis, however his grad school had no opportunity for an experimental thesis, so they allowed him to do it at NASA.

After his Ph.D. Frederick stayed on at NASA for a post doc. After that, Frederick was offered another post doc at a prestigious Ivy League school, not in theoretical physics but in experimental infra-red astronomy.

“Although I still considered myself a theoretician, I found myself 'type cast' as an experimentalist. And that, I think, was a large part of the problem I would have in fitting in.”

“...I definitely needed more and better guidance. I must admit though, that I wasn't the easiest person to guide. I like to think I've mellowed now. (No. Now that I think about it, I'd like to think I haven't mellowed.)”

In graduate school, Frederick wrote a very well received paper, 'Stochastic Space-time and Quantum Mechanics' that appeared in The Physical Review (a highly prestigious venue).

“I'd have thought my department chairman would have been happy for me, but instead he became enraged. On my explaining that I'd spent a day or so a week doing quantum mechanics, he said I'd have to make up the time. And he forbad me from doing any more work that was not directly related to my position as a post doc in experimental far infra-red astronomy.”

To be fair, Frederick was not as productive as he should have been in the department. Shortly after, Frederick's contract was not renewed and he left the department. Frederick moved to Ithaca, New York, where he started a computer consultancy company which later expanded to do contract engineering.

Return to physics

“In November 2013, I was roughing out a hard SF story where the protagonist was a physicist. As I worked on the ideas in the story, I realized I was not so much working on fiction as I was actually doing physics, and theoretical physics at that. Almost as an epiphany, I realized that the time had come; I should be working on physics again. I had the time and freedom. And if I didn't resume research then, I probably never would.”

Frederick took up physics again. He allocated five months where he devoted his full energy to do nothing but physics: thinking about quantum theory every waking moment and taking it to bed with him.
Frederick's starting point was his Stochastic Space-time paper from many years back.

“After relentlessly beating my head against the brick wall of an uncompromising theory, the wall began to crumble (as did arguably, my head). I realized that stochasticity had its limits; there was something else at play in the universe. That realization forced a major alteration of my Stochastic Space-time theory, a modification I call Crypto-stochastic Spacetime theory.”

Almost immediately, Crypto-stochastic Space-time theory gave results: he could explain the two-slit experiment, superposition in general, and explain photon polarization (a more compelling explanation than afforded by conventional quantum mechanics).

The joining of Frederick's stochastic and crypto-stochastic approaches resulted in a paper called 'Towards a Conceptual Model for Quantum Mechanics'.

Omnivac/Omnivor Robot
In 1983, OMNI magazine wanted a true robot (AI, etc.). Frederick (and his little start-up company Wolfdata) got the contract to build it. When OMNI closed, Frederick got his robot back. It currently 'lives' in his living room. (OMNI called the robot Omnivac. Frederick called it Omnivor.)

After he finished making the Omnivac, Frederick and his (startup) brought the robot in pieces to OMNI magazine's publisher, Bob Guccione's posh New York City brownstone.

Frederick and his company still needed to get the approval of OMNI to finish the robot for them. After a successful demo for the editorial staff of the influential electronics trade magazine, EDN, Frederick had to demonstrated the Omnivor to the top level officers of OMNI magazine. Ben Bova, OMNIs editor at the time, led the questioning of the Omnivor. It was he whom Frederick had to impress to get the contract to build the complete robot.
Frederick explains how the scene went down on his website:

“While my partner talked about how we could provide what OMNI wanted, I connected the robot head to the computer and fired up the system. Then I said 'hello' to the, as yet unnamed, robot. Nothing happened. I said 'hello' again, forcing my voice to the flat unemotional intonation that the voice recognition system required. Still, nothing. Then I smelled the smoke from the control-electronics circuit board. Using one of my partner's hands as a clamp (he continued his presentation the entire time), I took out a soldering iron and bypassed the rain-shorted subsystem. At that point, the robot almost worked. It 'understood' maybe one word in three, and its voice synthesis (through a rain-fritzed amplifier) sounded more like gargling then speech.”

Frederick went back to his home in Ithaca, extremely discouraged. However, the following day, he received a call from OMNI letting them know he got the contract. As it happened, a week earlier, OMNI had a very slick demo from another robot builder. But that robot was phony: a concealed, hand-held controller, etc. Ben Bova saw through it immediately. When Frederick finished his demonstration, Ben is reported to have said. “That was real engineering.”

Wolfdata
Frederick designed the world's first digital (1200 baud) modem. His company, Wolfdata, was moved to Chelmsford, Boston, and it became the first manufacturer of cheap, digital modems. Feeling unhappy with his role as a CEO, Frederick left Wolfdata, and returned to Ithaca, New York.

Personal
Chess
Frederick played chess professionally for a few years. He reached the title of Candidate Master. However, he regards it as a poorly misspent youth.

Fencing
Frederick was a professional epee fencer. During his career, due to a shoulder sprain, he had to switch from a right handed grip to a left handed grip.

Language
Frederick is a linguist, and can speak multiple languages, including Old English.

Opera
As a child, Frederick was in the Metropolitan Opera Boys Chorus.

Novels

Short fiction
 
 
 "A Higher Level of Misunderstanding" Analog Science Fiction and Fact 127/5 (May 2007)
 "A Zoo in the Jungle" Analog Science Fiction and Fact 127/6 (Jun 2007)
 "Yearning for the White Avenger" Analog Science Fiction and Fact 127/11 (Nov 2007)
 "The Engulfed Cathedral" Analog Science Fiction and Fact 128/1&2 (Jan/Feb 2008)
 "The Exoanthropic Principle" Analog Science Fiction and Fact 128/7&8 (Jul/Aug 2008)
 "Vita Longa" Analog Science Fiction and Fact 128/10 (Oct 2008)
 "Greenwich Nasty Time" Analog Science Fiction and Fact 128/11 (Nov 2008)
 "Lifespeed" Analog Science Fiction and Fact 129/3 (Mar 2009)
 "Teddy Bear Toys" Analog Science Fiction and Fact 129/10 (Oct 2009)
 "The Universe beneath Our Feet" Analog Science Fiction and Fact 129/12 (Dec 2009)
 "Narrow World" Analog Science Fiction and Fact 130/3 (Mar 2010)
 "A Sound Basis for Misunderstanding" Analog Science Fiction and Fact 130/4 (Apr 2010)
 
 
 
 
 
Analog Science Fiction and Fact
'The Spacemice Incident' (Jul/Aug 2003)
'The Study of Ants' (Sept 2003) 
'Misunderstanding Twelve' (April 2004)
'The Fruitcake Genome' (Dec 2004)
'General Tso's Chicken' (March 2005)
'Much Ado About Newton' (May 2005)
'This Little World' (June 2005)
'Prayer for a Dead Paramecium' (Jul/Aug 2005)
'Speed of Understanding' (Sep 2005)
'Hotel Security' (Dec 2005)
'The Skeekit-Woogle Test' (March 2006)
'The Emancipation of the Knowledge Robots' (April 2006)
'The Door That Does Not Close' (June 2006)
'The Teller of Time' (Jul/Aug 2006)
'Man, Descendent' (Nov 2006)
'Double Helix, Downward Gyre' (Jan/Feb 2007) 
'A Higher Level of Misunderstanding' (May 2007)
'A Zoo In the Jungle' (June 2007)
'Yearning for the White Avenger' (Nov 2007)
'The Engulfed Cathedral' (Jan/Feb 2008)
'What Drives Cars' (May 2008)
'The Exoanthropic Principle' (Jul/Aug 2008)
'Challenge of the Anthropic Universe' (Fact article Jul/Aug 2008)
'Vita Longa' (Oct 2008)
'Greenwich Nasty Time' (Nov 2008)
'Lifespeed' (Mar 2009) 
'The Universe Beneath our Feet' (Dec 2009)
'Teddy Bear Toys' (Oct 2009)
'Narrow World' (March 2010)
'Sound Basis for Misunderstanding' (April 2010)
'The Long Way Around' (Jul/Aug 2010)
'Howl of the Seismologist' (Nov 2010)
'Happy are the Bunyips' (Dec 2010)
'Helix of Friends' (Sept 2011)
'The Lycanthropic Principle' (Oct 2011) 
'Food Chained' (June 2012)
'Zeitgeist' (Jul/Aug 2012)
'Mythunderstanding' (Sept 2012)
'Reboots and Saddles' (Nov 2013)
'The Lost Bloodhound Sonata' (Apr 2013)
'Abridge too Far' (Dec 2013)
'Fear of Heights in the Tower of Babble' (Oct 2013)
'Mousunderstanding' (Feb 2014)
Asimov's Science Fiction
'We Are the Cat' (September 2006)
'Leonid Skies' (Oct/Nov 2007)
Jim Baens's Universe
'Weredragons of Mars' (June 2007)
'Concentration of Dogs' (August 2007)
'Food for Thought' (February 2009)
Writers of the Future
'The Art of Creation' (Published Finalist story Vol. XVIII 2002)
'A Boy and his Bicycle' (First Place story Vol. XIX 2003)
Space And Time
'Extra Cheese for the Laboratory Mouse' (issue 94 2001) [Carl's first published story]
ESLI
'The Study of Ants' [story appeared in Analog] 
'Prayer for a Dead Paramecium' [story appeared in Analog] 
'We Are the Cat' [story appeared in Asimov's]
'Man, Descendant' [story appeared in Analog] 
'A Zoo in the Jungle' [story appeared in Analog]
'The Exoanthropic Principle' [story appeared in Analog]
'Narrow World' [story appeared in Analog]
'Lifespeed' [story appeared in Analog]
'Universe Beneath our Feet' [story appeared in Analog]
'What Drives Cars' [story appeared in Analog]
'Howl of the Seismologist' [story appeared in Analog]
'The Lycanthropic Principle' [story appeared in Analog]
'Food Chained' (forthcoming) [story appeared in Analog]
Phobos
'The Messiah' (2002 prize anthology)
'Great Theme Prisons of the World' (2002 prize anthology)
'The Beast of All Possible Worlds' (2003 prize anthology)
Phobos/Galaxy
'The Ants of Imhotep' (March 2004)
'Deep Flows the River of Time' (March 2004)
Andromeda Spaceways Inflight Magazine
'Building Character' (Issue 2 2002)
'Medium Rare' (Issue 6 2003)
Flash Fiction Online
'The Dyslexicon' (April 2008)
Spectra Magazine
'Afterlives of Schroedinger's Cat' (Issue 4, 2011)
Topzine.cz
'Prayer for a Dead Paramecium' (Jan 2011) [appeared in Analog]
Into the New Millenium
'The Universe Beneath your Feet' [appeared in Analog]
'Carbide Tipped Pens' (Tor Anthology)
'Ambiguous Nature' (forthcoming)

Non-fiction
 
Nautilus Magazine
'Stochastic Spacetime' (science fact article) (forthcoming)

References

External links
 Carl Frederick's Home Page

Living people
21st-century American novelists
21st-century American short story writers
American male novelists
American male short story writers
American science fiction writers
Analog Science Fiction and Fact people
Writers from Ithaca, New York
21st-century American male writers
Novelists from New York (state)
Year of birth missing (living people)